Wolseley is a provincial electoral division in the Canadian province of Manitoba. It was created by redistribution in 1957, and has formally existed since the 1958 provincial election. The riding is located in the centre of the City of Winnipeg. It is named for Col. Garnet Joseph Wolseley, the nineteenth-century army officer who played a significant role in crushing the Red River Rebellion in 1870.

Wolseley is bordered to the east by Fort Rouge, to the south by River Heights, to the north by Minto, and to the west by St. James. The University of Winnipeg is located in the northeast corner of the riding. The Legislative Assembly of Manitoba is located at the meeting point of Wolseley and Fort Rouge.

The riding was predominantly Anglo-Saxon when it was first created; a news report from 1969 indicates that its population had become more diverse by that time.

The riding's population in 1996 was 20,472. In 1999, the average family income was $37,794, and the unemployment rate was 16.30%.  Half of the riding's residents are categorized as low-income, the second-highest rate in the province. Thirty per cent of families in the riding are single-parent.

The aboriginal population of Wolseley is 19% of the total. Five per cent of the riding's residents are Filipino.

Health and social services account for 13% of Wolseley's industry, with a further 12% in manufacturing.

Wolseley has undergone a number of dramatic political shifts since its creation. It was initially represented by Dufferin Roblin, a Red Tory who served as Premier of Manitoba from 1958 to 1967. He was succeeded by another Progressive Conservative, but in a 1972 by-election the riding was won by Izzy Asper, leader of the Manitoba Liberal Party and subsequently a prominent media baron in Canada.  He retained the riding until his retirement in 1975.

The New Democratic Party of Manitoba (NDP) did not manage to win the seat until 1981. However, the riding has been in NDP hands for all but two years since then. In the 2003 election, Green Party leader Markus Buchart ran in this riding and finished second with almost 20% of the vote.

Wolseley also holds the dubious distinction of having elected one of the few MLAs in Manitoba's history to be expelled from parliament: Robert Wilson, who was stripped of his seat in 1981 after being convicted of marijuana-related charges.

List of provincial representatives

Electoral results

Previous boundaries

References

Manitoba provincial electoral districts
Politics of Winnipeg
West End, Winnipeg